The Association of Cardiothoracic Surgical Assistants (ACSA) is a professional body in the United Kingdom that ACSA represents a body of non-medical practitioners working in cardiothoracic surgery, performing a range of skilled interventions. It was formed in 1997.

The ACSA supports its members by providing educational meetings, discussion forums and professional advice. Members also can receive indemnity cover at a reduced cost from the Medical Protection Society and receive a newsletter, have access to a members' forum and to archived educational material. ACSA represents its members in the Society of Cardiothoracic Surgery and has helped to develop the National Curriculum framework for surgical care practitioners.

History of ACSA 
In 1997, 12 surgical assistants from the UK met to discuss the future of cardiothoracic surgical assistants in the UK; a motion was passed to form the Association of Cardiothoracic Surgical Assistants (ACSA). Richard Ward was elected as its inaugural president, and the association identified the need for a support network and standard education and qualification practices.

The same year, the Society of Cardiothoracic Surgery, the Royal College of Surgeons of Great Britain and Ireland and ACSA formulated the Surgeons' Assistant Diploma in Cardiothoracic Surgery. In 1998, ACSA identified a need to run a revision course for future candidates for the diploma. This course has since run with great success.

In 2004, the title of Surgical Practitioner was reviewed by the United Kingdom Department of Health. The title was later changed once again to "Surgical Care Practitioner (SCP)". This title is still used today although it should be said that it is still only a working title due to disputes with other groups. The same year, work began on the National Curriculum Framework for SCPs, started by the Department of Health.

ACSA worked with many other organisations including the Royal College of Surgeons, the National Association of Assistants in Surgical Practice, the Association for Perioperative Practice, the Association of Surgeons in Training, the Association of Operating Department Practitioners, the British Orthopaedic Trainees Association, and the Royal College of Obstetricians and Gynaecologists.

In 2006 the National Curriculum framework was published. In 2007 ACSA and SCTS decided to start holding their Annual General Meetings to coincide with each other.

Steven Bryant went on to become president of ACSA for two years, during this time Steven attended many meetings at the RCS and other organisations such as the 'new ways of working' department, set up  by the last government to discuss the future development of the surgical assistant/care practitioner. He is widely credited as one of the leading lights in the profession and in 2011 became the first non-medically qualified practitioner to become an examiner for the RCS diploma. Steven Bryant continues to work at Papworth hospital in Cambridgeshire as the lead scp Papworth Hospital is regarded as one of the main training centres for SA/SCP  training in the UK and abroad.

ACSA meetings and Presidents past and present

External links 
www.acsa-web.co.uk ACSA website

Surgical organisations based in the United Kingdom
Thoracic surgery